The C&C SR 25 is a Canadian racing sailboat that was designed by Glenn Henderson and first built in 1996.

Production
The design was built by C&C Yachts starting in 1996. It was the last of the SR series of boats and fewer than three were completed.

Design
The SR 25 is a racing keelboat, built predominantly of fibreglass. It has a fractional sloop rig, a nearly plumb stem, a reverse transom, an internally-mounted spade-type rudder controlled by a tiller and a lifting fin keel. It displaces .

The boat may be fitted with a small outboard motor for docking and maneuvering.

The design has a PHRF racing average handicap of 120 with a high of 126 and low of 120.

See also
List of sailing boat types

Related development
C&C SR 21
C&C SR 27
C&C SR 33

Similar sailboats
Achilles 24
Challenger 24
Melges 24
J/80

References

Keelboats
1990s sailboat type designs
Sailing yachts
Sailboat type designs by Glenn Henderson
Sailboat types built by C&C Yachts